Cheese Hill is a mountain in Albany County, New York. It is located north-northeast of Alcove. Henry Hill is located north-northeast and North Hill is located northeast of Cheese Hill.

References

Mountains of Albany County, New York
Mountains of New York (state)